Li Ganjie (born 11 November 1964) is a Chinese politician serving as a member of the Politburo of the Chinese Communist Party. He has previously served as head of the National Nuclear Safety Administration, deputy party secretary of Hebei, the Minister of Ecology and Environment (previously as the Minister of Environmental Protection) from 2017 to 2020, and the Communist Party Secretary of Shandong from 2021 to 2022.

Biography 
Li was born in Wangcheng County, Hunan province. He joined the Communist Party of China in 1984, while attending Tsinghua University, where he studied industrial physics and nuclear safety. He has a master's degree in engineering.  In July 1989, after completing graduate studies, he became an engineer at the National Nuclear Safety Administration's Beijing office. Between September 1991 and January 1993, he studied in France. Between March 1993 and July 1998, he took on a series of successively senior roles at the Nuclear Safety Administration. In 1998 he was sent as a guazhi deputy party secretary of Pingjiang County, Hunan.

In January 1999, Li began working at the office of the Chinese Ambassador to France, specializing in technology affairs. In July 2000, he was transferred to the State Administration for Environmental Protection (SEPA, later established as a ministry). He then took on a series of leading positions specializing in nuclear safety, eventually rising to head of the National Nuclear Safety Administration in December 2006. In March 2008, after reforms, Li took on the concurrent post of Deputy Minister of Environmental Protection.

In October 2016, Li was transferred to become Deputy Party Secretary of Hebei province.

In June 2017, Li was named Minister of Environmental Protection. At the time of his appointment he was the youngest member of the ministerial level officials of the State Council.

In April 2020, Li was appointed as the acting Governor of Shandong Province. He was elected as the governor in July.

In October 2022, Li was elected to the 20th Politburo of the Chinese Communist Party. He is the youngest member of the Politburo.

References 

Tsinghua University alumni
1964 births
Politicians from Changsha
Living people
Chinese Communist Party politicians from Hunan
People's Republic of China politicians from Hunan
Members of the 19th Central Committee of the Chinese Communist Party
Members of the 20th Politburo of the Chinese Communist Party
Governors of Shandong